The Colorado Badged Network (CBN) is a Colorado business that focuses on connecting the Colorado cannabis industry. At one point, it was the largest Colorado cannabis industry organization, with over 6100 members as of November 2018, and journalist Spencer J. Ward claimed that could have been the largest network of licensed cannabis professionals in the world at its peak.

Purpose
On Colorado Badged Network, members find jobs, employees, legal advice, compliance updates, industry events, and friends. It's been called the "water cooler of the industry", and the goal is to keep is accessible to everyone with a Colorado Department of Revenue Occupational License, which is known as a "badge" in Colorado.

History
The group was first created as Colorado Badged Jobs in 2015, in order for Webb to find employees to work in his cannabis grow warehouse. He quickly brought in co-founders Maccarone and Witherell to help. The organization grew steadily for its first year, and it became used for more purposes than just job-searching, such as removing cannabis smell for clothing, what are the best trimming shears, how to best budtend, announcing new products, and venting about Metrc.

In early 2017, the three co-founders decided to rename the group to Colorado Badged Network to better reflect its new identity. This has been a volunteer position for them through 2018, without any financial compensation; they're cannabis industry members themselves.

Members
In June 2018, the group had over 5000 members. By November 2018, the Colorado Badged Network grew to more than 6100 members.

CBN is very active, being described as "robust". As of June 2018, there were about 40 posts per day.

Representatives from Mary’s Medicinals, Bronnor Corporation, the Cannabis Connoisseurs’ Coalition Committee have expressed that they find high value in the group.

Criticism
Some badge-holders have refused to join the group due to "privacy concerns", because the co-founders verify unique badge numbers. The State of Colorado keeps a database of every occupational license holder, which is searchable by both name and badge number. Witherell has made a statement about these privacy concerns, clarifying, "We only verify publicly accessible information to grant access to the network."

See also
 National Cannabis Industry Association
 Colorado Department of Revenue
 Cannabis product testing
 Budtender

References

External links
 
 Facebook Group: CBN Official

Organizations established in 2015
Organizations based in Denver
Cannabis in Colorado
Cannabis companies
Cannabis culture
2015 in cannabis
Companies based in Denver